Omladinski fudbalski klub Ravan (Serbian Cyrillic: Омладински  фудбалски  клуб  Раван), commonly known as OFK Ravan, is a Bosnian football club from Kozarska Dubica, Republika Srpska, more precisely from a village Međeđa. They have played in the Second League of the Republika Srpska since 2003, but were relegated to the Regional League in 2012.

History 
The club was founded in 1971 under the name "Mladost". After the founding of the club competes in the Dubica Municipal League. In 1978 they were promoted to Gradiška District League where they competed until 1992, when the War in Bosnia stopped activities.

OFK Ravan renewed its work in 1998, when they joined the Prijedor Regional League. In 2003 they were promoted to Second League of the Republika Srpska, West Division.

Club records

Best results 
 Second League of the Republika Srpska, West Division
 6th place: 2004–05
 Republika Srpska Cup
 16th-finals (2): 2002–03, 2004–05
 RFA Prijedor Cup
 Winners (2): 2002–03, 2004–05

External links 
 History of OFK Ravan

Football clubs from Dubica, Bosnia and Herzegovina
Football clubs in Republika Srpska
Football clubs in Bosnia and Herzegovina
Association football clubs established in 1971
1971 establishments in Bosnia and Herzegovina